
John E. Toews is a Canadian historian in the U.S.,  and Director of the Comparative History of Ideas Program, University of Washington from 1981 to 2010.

He graduated from Harvard University, with a Ph.D. in 1973.

Awards
 1984 MacArthur Fellows Program
 2004-2005 Hans Rosenberg Prize of the American Historical Association for the best book in German and Central European History

Works
Becoming Historical: Cultural Reformation and Public Memory in Early Nineteenth-Century Berlin (Cambridge University Press, 2004).
"Refashioning the Masculine Subject in Early Modernism", in Marke Micale, ed. The Mind of Modernism: Medicine, Psychology and the Cultural Arts in Europe and America 1880-1940, Stanford University Press, 2003.
"The Linguistic Turn and Discourse Analysis in History," International Encyclopedia of the Social Sciences, Elsevier Press, 2001, XIII, 8916-1932.
The Communist Manifesto by Karl Marx and Frederick Engels, edited, Bedford/St. Martin's, 1999.
"Having and Being: The Evolution of Freud's Oedipus Theory as a Moral Fable", in Michael Roth ed., Sigmund Freud: Conflict and Culture, Alfred Knopf, 1998. 
Hegelianism: The Path Toward Dialectical Humanism, 1805-1841, Cambridge University Press, 1981.  
"A New Philosophy of History? Reflections on Postmodern Historicizing".(JSTOR)  History and Theory, 1997. 36 (2):235–248

See also
 History of ideas
 Intellectual history

References

Living people
University of Washington faculty
Harvard University alumni
MacArthur Fellows
21st-century American historians
21st-century American male writers
Philosophers of history
1937 births
American male non-fiction writers